The 2020 PEI Tankard, the provincial men's curling championship for Prince Edward Island, was held from January 8 to 12 at the Montague Curling Rink in Montague, Prince Edward Island. The winning Bryan Cochrane rink represented Prince Edward Island at the 2020 Tim Hortons Brier in Kingston, Ontario and finished with a 2–5 record. The event was held in conjunction with the 2020 Prince Edward Island Scotties Tournament of Hearts, the provincial women's championship.

The Cochrane rink went undefeated through the whole tournament, not losing a game as they won all three qualifying events.

Teams
The teams are listed as follows:

Knockout brackets

A event

B event

C event

Knockout results

Draw 1 
Wednesday, January 8, 9:00 am

Draw 2 
Wednesday, January 8, 2:00 pm

Draw 3 
Wednesday, January 8, 7:00 pm

Draw 4 
Thursday, January 9, 9:00 am

Draw 5 
Thursday, January 9, 2:00 pm

Draw 6 
Thursday, January 9, 7:00 pm

Draw 7 
Friday, January 10, 9:00 am

Draw 8 
Friday, January 10, 2:00 pm

Draw 9 
Friday, January 10, 7:00 pm

Draw 10 
Saturday, January 11, 9:00 am

Draw 11 
Saturday, January 11, 2:00 pm

Draw 12 
Saturday, January 11, 7:00 pm

Playoffs

No playoffs were required as the Bryan Cochrane rink won all three qualifying events.

Semifinal
Sunday, January 12, 9:00 am

Final
Sunday, January 12, 2:00 pm

References

External links

Prince Edward Island
Curling competitions in Prince Edward Island
January 2020 sports events in Canada
2020 in Prince Edward Island
Montague, Prince Edward Island